The Territorial Prelature of Ayaviri is a Roman Catholic territorial prelature located in the city of Ayaviri in the Ecclesiastical province of Arequipa in Peru.

History
On 30 July 1958, the Territorial Prelature of Ayaviri was established from the Diocese of Puno.
On 3 April 2019 from its and the Roman Catholic Territorial Prelature of Juli was established the Roman Catholic Territorial Prelature of Santiago Apóstol de Huancané

Ordinaries
 Prelates of Ayaviri (Roman rite)
José Juan Luciano Carlos Metzinger Greff, SS.CC. (30 July 1958 – 31 January 1971)
Louis Dalle SS.CC. (1970 - 1982)
Paco d'Alteroche (1982 - 1993) 
Juan Godayol Colom, S.D.B. (4 December 1991 – 18 February 2006)
Kay Martin Schmalhausen Panizo, S.C.V. (18 February 2006 – 7 April 2021)

References
 GCatholic.org
 Catholic Hierarchy
 Prelature website 

Roman Catholic dioceses in Peru
Roman Catholic Ecclesiastical Province of Arequipa
Christian organizations established in 1958
Roman Catholic dioceses and prelatures established in the 20th century
Territorial prelatures
1958 establishments in Peru